Tonna tetracotula is a species of very large sea snail or tun snail, a marine gastropod mollusc in the family Tonnidae, the tun shells.

References

 Powell A. W. B., William Collins Publishers Ltd, Auckland 1979 

Tonnidae
Gastropods described in 1919